ReCALL is an academic journal of the European Association for Computer Assisted Language Learning, published by Cambridge University Press. The journal's main focus is the use of technologies for language learning and teaching. It was established in 1989 and previously published by the CTI Centre of the University of Hull. It publishes approximately 20 articles per year. The articles cover various aspects of CALL (computer-assisted language learning) and technology enhanced language learning.

Abstracting and indexing 
The journal is currently abstracted and indexed in ERIC, EBSCOhost, Educational Research Abstracts, Inspec, Linguistics and Language Behavior Abstracts, MLA International Bibliography, ProQuest, PsycINFO, Scopus, Social Sciences Citation Index.

References

External links 
 

Linguistics journals
Computer science journals
Triannual journals
Cambridge University Press academic journals
Publications established in 1989
English-language journals
Academic journals associated with learned and professional societies